Lukáš Rosol (born 24 July 1985) is a Czech professional tennis player. He competes on the ATP Challenger Tour and the ATP Tour, both in singles and doubles. Rosol was coached by former Czech player, 1999 US Open quarterfinalist Ctislav Doseděl. His career-high singles ranking is world No. 26, achieved on 22 September 2014.

His first notable victory was against world No. 8, Jürgen Melzer, at the 2011 French Open, whom he defeated in five sets in the second round a year after Melzer had reached the semifinal. A year later, Rosol defeated world No. 2, Rafael Nadal, in the second round of Wimbledon to achieve one of the biggest wins in his career. Rosol has had sustained success since then having played an integral part in the Czech Republic's Davis Cup winning team in 2012, and winning his first tour-level title in April 2013.

Rosol also played in the longest ever ATP doubles match, alongside Tomáš Berdych, defeating Marco Chiudinelli and Stanislas Wawrinka in the first round of the 2013 Davis Cup. The match was played on 2 February 2013, lasting 7 hours, 1 minute. It was the second longest ATP match of any kind, after the Isner–Mahut match at the 2010 Wimbledon Championships.

Personal life
Rosol was born in Brno, Czechoslovakia. In November 2008, he married Czech athlete Denisa Rosolová (née Ščerbová). In 2011, they divorced. In 2013, Rosol became engaged to news presenter Michaela Ochotská. Their son André was born in January 2015. The pair married in July 2015 and were divorced in July 2017. In 2018 Rosol entered into his third marriage with Petra Kubinová. 
His surname means jelly in Czech.

Tennis career
Rosol has won eight Challenger and seven Futures tournaments. In April 2013, he won his first tour-level tournament, the BRD Nastase Tiriac Trophy ATP World Tour 250, and in August 2014, he won his first tour-level tournament on hard courts, the Winston-Salem Open.

2012
Rosol rose to prominence in 2012 at the Wimbledon Championships, after having participated in the Wimbledon qualifying draw multiple times, not reaching the main draw until then. In the first round, he defeated Ivan Dodig, then he was drawn against the two-time champion and world No. 2, Rafael Nadal. After losing the first set in a very close tiebreak, Rosol regrouped and broke in the first game of the second. A dominant serving performance allowed him to take the second set 6–4. Rosol's service game held up in the third set, where he capitalized on a sloppy game by Nadal and took the set 6–4. Down two sets to one, Nadal raised his level in the fourth, taking the set 6–2 and sending the match into a deciding fifth set. At this point the match was delayed by 35 minutes in order to close the Centre Court roof. Rosol returned from the break revitalized, taking the fifth set 6–4 by striking 20 winners to two unforced errors. His groundstroke speed averaged 85 mph and peaked at 114 mph. In the final game of the match, Rosol delivered three aces and a forehand winner to close out one of the greatest upsets in Grand Slam history by a score of 6–7(9–11), 6–4, 6–4, 2–6, 6–4. He went on to lose his third-round match against Philipp Kohlschreiber in straight sets.

In the doubles draw, Rosol and partner Mikhail Kukushkin defeated the British duo of Colin Fleming and Ross Hutchins in five sets in the first round. They lost in the second round to James Cerretani and Édouard Roger-Vasselin.

2013

At the Australian Open, Rosol defeated Jamie Baker in the first round before he lost to 13th seed Milos Raonic in the second.

In April, he won his first ATP Tour singles tournament with a victory in Bucharest. He was unseeded in the tournament and beat three seeded players en route to the final: third seed Andreas Seppi, eighth seed Viktor Troicki and second seed Gilles Simon. In the final, he defeated Guillermo García-López, only dropping one set throughout the entire tournament and tearfully dedicating the triumph to his father, who introduced him to tennis and had died two weeks before the tournament.

At the French Open, Rosol lost in the second round to Fabio Fognini in four sets.

2014: Career-high ranking
Rosol began his 2014 season at the Qatar Open in Doha, losing in straight sets to eventual champion Rafael Nadal.
He reached the second round in the Apia International Sydney, and the quarterfinals of the Dubai Tennis Championships, where he lost to eventual champion Roger Federer.

At Indian Wells, Rosol faced reigning Wimbledon champion Andy Murray in the second round and was defeated in three sets after leading by a set and a break.

At Wimbledon, he was one point from a two-set lead against Rafael Nadal in the second round, but Nadal came back to win in four sets.

At the Mercedes Cup in Stuttgart, Rosol reached the final beating Mikhail Youzhny along the way, in the final he lost in three sets to Roberto Bautista Agut.

In August, Rosol won his second ATP title at the Winston-Salem Open, defeating Jerzy Janowicz in three sets. Lukas moved up to a career-high ranking of No. 26 in the world, a career high, in the ATP rankings released 22 September 2014.

2015
In 2015, he was the 28th seed but lost in second round of the Australian Open in five sets to Dudi Sela. 
At Indian Wells, he was the 27th seed and thus received a bye into the second round and defeated Martin Kližan and Robin Haase to reach the fourth round, his best showing at a Masters 1000 level in his career, where he lost to Tomáš Berdych. At Miami, he was the 26th seed and once again received a bye into the second round, where he beat qualifier and future top ten Alexander Zverev. In the third round, he lost to David Ferrer in straight sets.

At the French Open, Rosol defeated seeded player Bautista Agut to reach the third round. He also reached his first Grand Slam quarterfinal in doubles with Radu Albot.

At Wimbledon, Rosol defeated former No. 10 player Ernests Gulbis to reach the second round, where he fell to Pablo Andújar in five sets.

2016
At the 2016 Australian Open he reached the third round, his best showing in this Grand Slam in his career where he lost to Stan Wawrinka.

In February he participated in the inaugural edition of the Sofia Open netting the first win of the event against Robin Haase. He was defeated by 7th seed Martin Kližan in the second round.

In May ranked No. 68, he reached the quarterfinals of the 2016 Geneva Open defeating John Isner. He defeated Andrey Kuznetsov (tennis) to reach the semifinals before losing again to top seed and eventual champion Stan Wawrinka.

2022: First Wimbledon main draw participation in 5 years
He qualified for the main draw at the 2022 Wimbledon Championships after five years of absence. It was his first main draw participation at Wimbledon since 2017.

He reached the final at the 2022 Istanbul Challenger where he lost to Radu Albot. As a result he moved back into the top 250 at No. 239 on 19 September 2022.

Controversies
He has had several confrontations with top-ten players including Andy Murray and Rafael Nadal. He deliberately knocked over one of Nadal's water bottles at the changeover - Nadal being known to be particularly superstitious about his water bottle placement. He also shouldered Andy Murray at a changeover. Murray said later in the match, loud enough to be heard by the audience and television microphones "No-one likes you on the tour. Everybody hates you."

Performance timelines

Singles
Current through the 2021 US Open

Doubles

ATP career finals

Singles: 4 (2 titles, 2 runner-ups)

Doubles: 3 (3 titles)

Wins against top-10 players per season
He has a  record against players who were, at the time the match was played, ranked in the top 10.

Wins over top-ten players per season

Challenger and Futures/World Tennis Tour Finals

Singles: 30 (18–12)

Doubles: 50 (25–25)

References

External links
 
 
 

1985 births
Living people
Czech male tennis players
Sportspeople from Brno
Olympic tennis players of the Czech Republic
Tennis players at the 2016 Summer Olympics